The Beijing Office, officially the Office of the Government of the Hong Kong Special Administrative Region of the People's Republic of China in Beijing (BJO), is the representative office of the Government of Hong Kong in the national capital Beijing.  

Its counterpart office is the Liaison Office of the Central People's Government in the Hong Kong Special Administrative Region, representative office of the Central Government of the People's Republic of China in Hong Kong.

Main functions

 Further enhancing Hong Kong SAR Government's liaison and communication with the Central People's Government of the People's Republic of China
 Facilitating exchange and co-operation in business and other aspects between Hong Kong and Mainland China
 Promoting Hong Kong to Mainland China residents
 Processing applications for entry to Hong Kong
 Providing practical assistance to Hong Kong residents in distress in Mainland China

Transport
The office is accessible within walking distance East from Beihai North Station of the Beijing Subway.

See also
 Liaison Office of the Central People's Government in the Hong Kong Special Administrative Region
 Hong Kong Economic and Trade Office
 Foreign relations of Hong Kong
 Office of the Macau Special Administrative Region in Beijing
 One country, two systems

References

External links
 http://www.bjo.gov.hk/en/home/index.html

1999 establishments in China
Government agencies established in 1999
Government buildings in China
Hong Kong Economic and Trade Office